Arnold “Lucky Arnie” Oliver (May 22, 1907 – October 16, 1993) was a U.S. soccer attacking midfielder. He spent at least six seasons in the American Soccer League.  He was a member of the U.S. team at the 1930 FIFA World Cup and is a member of the National Soccer Hall of Fame.

Club career
Oliver, the son of British immigrants, began his career with the New Bedford Quisset Mill, a cotton mill, club when he was fourteen.  He then played with the Shawsheen Indians, a local amateur club which joined the professional American Soccer League in 1925.  However, Oliver remained an amateur and when the Indians folded during the season, he moved to the Defenders Club, winning the 1926 National Amateur Cup title with them.  Following the Amateur Cup final, Oliver turned professional when he signed with the New Bedford Whalers.  He played only one game with the Whalers and in 1927, he moved to the Hartford Americans.  However, they were kicked out of the league after only ten games and Oliver moved to J&P Coats for the remainder of the season.  He spent most of the 1928–1929 season with J&P Coats, where he was at one point in a three-way tie for the league's scoring lead, but finished the season with the New Bedford Whalers.  Oliver then moved to the Pawtucket Rangers for the fall 1929 season.  In the fall of 1930, he began the season with the Marksmen before transferring to the Providence Gold Bugs.  In the spring of 1931, he played with Fall River F.C. then with the Pawtucket Rangers in the fall of 1931. Some sources state Oliver ended his career in the American Soccer League in 1931, others say 1935.  However, all agree that he finished his career with the amateur Santo Christos in 1938.

National team
In 1930, Oliver was called into the U.S. national team for the 1930 FIFA World Cup.  He did not enter any of the U.S. games at the tournament but played several exhibition games during the U.S. team's South American tour following the cup.  However, none of those games are considered full internationals.

Coaching
Following his retirement from playing, Oliver coached extensively.  In 1966, he became the first head coach of the UMass Dartmouth men's soccer team.  From the team's founding in 1966 through the 1969 season, Oliver took the team to a 40-11-2 record.

Oliver was inducted into the National Soccer Hall of Fame in 1968, the New England Soccer Hall of Fame in 1981 and the UMass Dartmouth Hall of Fame in 1997.

References

External links
 June 20, 2002 newspaper profile
 National Soccer Hall of Fame profile

1907 births
1930 FIFA World Cup players
1993 deaths
Sportspeople from New Bedford, Massachusetts
Soccer players from Massachusetts
American soccer players
American Soccer League (1921–1933) players
Shawsheen Indians players
New Bedford Whalers players
Hartford Americans players
J&P Coats players
Pawtucket Rangers players
Providence Gold Bug players
Fall River Marksmen players
Fall River F.C. players
American Soccer League (1933–1983) players
American soccer coaches
National Soccer Hall of Fame members
Association football forwards